Coleophora breyeri is a moth of the family Coleophoridae. It is found in Argentina.

References

breyeri
Moths described in 1963
Moths of South America